Hans Stangl (8 March 1888 – 25 September 1963) was a German sculptor. His work was part of the sculpture event in the art competition at the 1936 Summer Olympics.

References

1888 births
1963 deaths
20th-century German sculptors
20th-century German male artists
German male sculptors
Olympic competitors in art competitions
People from Munich